D65  may refer to:
 Illuminant D65, a commonly used standard illuminant defined by the International Commission on Illumination
 Greek destroyer Nearchos (D65)
 HMS Codrington  (D65), a 1930 A-class destroyer of the Royal Navy
 HMS St. James (D65), a 1946 Battle-class destroyer of the Royal Navy
 SPS Blas de Lezo (D65), a Spanish Navy ship
 INS Chennai (D65), an Indian Navy ship
 the former designation for the Slovakian R1 expressway
 D 65 road (United Arab Emirates) (Al Manara Road), a road passing in Umm Suqeim